Thitarodes xizangensis is a species of moth of the family Hepialidae. It is known from the Tibet Autonomous Region in China.

References

External links
Hepialidae genera

Moths described in 1985
Hepialidae